The Ministry of Internal Affairs of the Russian Federation (MVD; , Ministerstvo vnutrennikh del) is the interior ministry of Russia.

The MVD is responsible for law enforcement in Russia through its agencies the Police of Russia, Migration Affairs, Drugs Control, Traffic Safety, the Centre for Combating Extremism, and the Investigative Department. The MVD is headquartered in Zhitnaya Street 16 in Yakimanka, Moscow.

The MVD claims ancestry from the Ministry of Internal Affairs of the Russian Empire founded in 1802 by Tsar Alexander I which became the interior ministry of the Russian Republic, the Russian Soviet Federative Socialist Republic, and the Soviet Union. The MVD was dissolved and reformed several times during the Stalin era until being established as the Ministry of Internal Affairs of the USSR in 1946. The current MVD was formed in 1990 from the Russian branch of the MVD of the USSR shortly before the dissolution of the Soviet Union.

Vladimir Kolokoltsev has been the Minister of Internal Affairs since 21 May 2012.

History

Russian Empire 

The first interior ministry in Russia was created by Tsar Alexander I on 28 March 1802 in the process of government reforms to replace the aging collegia of Peter the Great. The MVD was one of the most powerful governmental bodies of the Empire, responsible for the police forces and Internal Guards and the supervision of gubernial administrations. Its initial responsibilities also included penitentiaries, firefighting, state enterprises, the state postal system, state property, construction, roads, medicine, clergy, natural resources, and nobility; most of them were transferred to other ministries and government bodies by the mid-19th century.

Police
As the central government began to further partition the countryside, the ispravniks were distributed among the sections. Serving under them in their principal localities were commissaries.  and  alike were armed with broad and obscurely-defined powers, which, combined with the fact that they were for the most part illiterate and wholly ignorant of the law, formed crushing forces of oppression. These  rapidly became the terror of the countryside. Finally, in the towns of the rural countryside, every house was provided with a "guard dog" of sorts, in the form of a porter, who was charged with the duty of reporting the presence of any suspicious characters or anything of interest to the police.

Secret Police
In addition to the above there was also the secret police, in direct subordination to the ministry of the interior, of which the principal function is the discovery, prevention, and extirpation of political sedition. Its most famous development was the so-called Third Section (of the imperial chancery) instituted by the emperor Nicholas I in 1826. This was entirely independent of the ordinary police, but was associated with the previously existing Special Corps of Gendarmes, whose chief was placed at its head. Its object had originally been to keep the emperor in close touch with all the branches of the administration and to bring to his notice any abuses and irregularities, and for this purpose its chief was in constant personal intercourse with the sovereign.

Following the growth of the revolutionary movement and assassination of Emperior Alexander II, the Department of State Police inherited the secret police functions of the dismissed Third Section and transferred the most capable Gendarmes to the Okhrana. In 1896 the powers of the minister were extended at the expense of those of the under-secretary, who remained only at the head of the corps of gendarmes; but by a law of 24 September 1904 this was again reversed, and the under-secretary was again placed at the head of all the police with the title of under-secretary for the administration of the police.

By World War I, the department had spawned a counter-intelligence section. After the February Revolution of 1917, the Gendarmes and the Okhrana were disbanded as anti-revolutionary.

Soviet Era 

Having won the October Revolution, the Bolsheviks disbanded the tsarist police forces and formed an all-proletarian Workers' and Peasants' Militsiya under the NKVD of the Russian SFSR. After the establishment of the USSR there was no Soviet (federal) NKVD until 1934.

In March 1946, all of the People's Commissariats (NK) were redesignated as Ministries (M). The NKVD was renamed the MVD of the USSR, along with its former subordinate, the NKGB which became the MGB of the USSR. The NKVDs of Union Republics also became Ministries of Internal Affairs subordinate to MVD of the USSR.

Secret police became a part of MVD after Lavrenty Beria merged the MGB into the MVD in March 1953. Within a year Beria's downfall caused the MVD to be split up again; after that, the MVD retained its "internal security" (police) functions, while the new KGB took on "state security" (secret police) functions.

In his efforts to fight bureaucracy and maintain 'Leninist principles', Nikita Khrushchev, as the Premier of the Union, called for the dismissal of the All-Union MVD. The Ministry ceased to exist in January 1960 and its functions were transferred to the respective Republican Ministries. The MVD of the Russian SFSR was renamed the Ministry for Securing the Public Order in 1962.

Leonid Brezhnev again recreated the All-Union Ministry for Securing the Public Order in July 1966 and later assigned Nikolai Shchelokov as Minister; the RSFSR Ministry was disbanded for the second time, the first being at the creation of the NKVD of the Soviet Union. The MVD regained its original title in 1968.

Another role of the reformed MVD was to combat economic crimes, that is, to suppress private business which was largely prohibited by socialist law. This fight was never successful due to the pervasive nature of the black market.

Russian Federation 
The Russian MVD re-formed as the MVD of the Russian SFSR in 1990 following the restoration of the republican Council of Ministers and the Supreme Soviet. It continued in its functions when Russia gained independence from the Soviet Union in 1991.  the Ministry controls:

 the Politsiya (formerly Militsiya)
 the General Administration for Traffic Safety
 the Federal Drug Control Service

Since the disbanding of the Tax Police Service in 2003 the MVD also investigates economic crimes.

Two long-time units of the Imperial MVD and NKVD, the Firefighting Service and the Prisons Service, transferred to the Ministry of Emergency Situations in 2001 and to the Ministry of Justice in 2006 respectively. The last reorganization abolished Main Directorates inherited from the NKVD in favour of Departments. In 2012 Vladimir Kolokoltsev became the Minister of Internal Affairs in Russia.

On 5 April 2016, Russian President Vladimir Putin ordered the Internal Troops, OMON (the Special Purpose Mobility Unit), and SOBR (SWAT) forces to form the basis of the new National Guard of Russia, and these moved from MVD control and were reassigned to the Security Council of Russia. In turn and on the same day, the Federal Drug Control Service and the Federal Migration Service merged into the MVD and is now known as the Main Directorate for Drugs Control and the Main Directorate for Migration Affairs, respectively.

In December 2019, Distributed Denial of Secrets listed a leak from Russia's Ministry of the Interior, portions of which detailed the deployment of Russian troops to Ukraine at a time when the Kremlin was denying a military presence there. Some material from that leak was published in 2014, about half of it was not, and WikiLeaks reportedly rejected a request to host the files two years later, at a time when Julian Assange was focused on exposing Democratic Party documents passed to WikiLeaks by Kremlin hackers.

Ministers

See also

 Awards of the Ministry of Internal Affairs of Russia
 List of Ministers of Interior of Imperial Russia
 Crimea Police
 MVD Ensemble
 Ministry of Police of Imperial Russia
 Military of Russia
 Militsiya
 Moscow Police
 Nizhny Novgorod Oblast Police
 Primorsky Krai Police
 Saint Petersburg Police
 Sevastopol Police
 Sochi Police

Sports
 Former HC MVD of the KHL

References

Further reading 
 Ronald Hingley, The Russian Secret Police, Muscovite, Imperial Russian and Soviet. Political Security Operations, 1565–1970
 Dominic Lieven (ed.), The Cambridge History of Russia, Volume II: Imperial Russia, 1689–1917, Cambridge University Press (2006), .

External links

Russian
 Timeline of MVD, 1801–1997

 
Internal Affairs, Ministry of
Internal Affairs, Ministry of
Russia
Internal Affairs, Ministry of
Russia, Internal Affairs
Internal Affairs, Ministry of